Quincy Douby (born May 16, 1984) is an American–born, naturalized Montenegrin former professional basketball player. The Sacramento Kings made him the 19th selection of the 2006 NBA Draft.

High school career
Douby grew up in the Coney Island neighborhood of Brooklyn. He attended the nearby William E. Grady High School, playing for the basketball team his junior and senior years, after he was discovered playing pick up basketball by New York City Hall of Fame coach Jack Ringel. Ringel helped develop Douby's raw skills and athletism and transform his as player. During his junior season, Grady won the PSAL A division championship, with Douby scoring 19 points in the championship game after Grady rode him the whole season. In his senior year, Douby averaged 35.6 points per game, leading Grady to the PSAL semifinals. Douby set the school record by scoring 63 points in an all–around performance against Franklin D. Roosevelt High School. Douby then enrolled in the St. Thomas More School prep school in Oakdale, Connecticut for the 2002–2003 year. Douby initially committed to Hofstra University to play basketball, until head coach of Rutgers University Men's Basketball team, Gary Waters jumped in and swayed Douby to commit to the Scarlet Knights. Douby was able to make the transformation from a street baller, to a division one basketball player.

Due to his close relationship with high school coach Jack Ringel, Douby would purchase a house in Ringel's neighboring town of Freehold, New Jersey.

College career
As a freshman at Rutgers, Douby scored 35 points to lead the team to an overtime victory in the NIT semifinal game. Douby was named to the Big East All–Rookie Team at the end of his freshman year.

Douby improved on his freshman season by averaging 15.1 points a game (11th in the Big East) and 3.38 assists a game, while posting an assist-to-turnover ratio of 2:1. He was named Big East player of the Week along with West Virginia's Tyrone Sally the week of November 29. Despite finishing last in the Big East, Rutgers upset Notre Dame in the first round of the Big East Tournament, with Douby scoring 15 points in the game.

In his junior year, Douby, as guard, was named to the All Big–East team. He led the Big East in scoring with 25.4 points a game, becoming the first Rutgers player to lead the Big East in scoring. In addition, he broke the all–time single season scoring record at Rutgers. Douby scored a Big East season high and Carrier Dome opponent record 41 points at Syracuse on February 1, 2006. After leading Rutgers to a first round victory in the Big East tournament over Seton Hall, Douby dropped 31 over the #2 Villanova Wildcats. On May 15, 2006, Douby officially hired an agent making himself ineligible to return to college.

Professional career
On June 28, 2006, Douby was drafted in the first round by the Sacramento Kings, 19th overall. Douby became the first Rutgers player to be drafted in the first round since Roy Hinson in 1983. On July 3, 2006, he was signed to a contract by Sacramento.

On February 18, 2009, Douby was waived by the Kings in order make room for the trade that included Brad Miller and Drew Gooden.

On March 11, 2009, Douby was picked up by the Erie BayHawks of the NBA Development League.

On March 24, 2009, he was called up by the Toronto Raptors and signed to a 10-day contract. On April 3, he was signed to a second 10-day contract, which was extended up until the end of the 2008–09 season ten days later.

On November 12, 2009, Douby was released by the Raptors. He did not appear in any games for them during the 2009–10 NBA season.

On November 17, 2009, Douby signed a one–year contract with the Turkish team Darüşşafaka Cooper Tires. He finished as the top scorer of the Turkish Basketball League, averaging 23.6 points and 4.9 assists per game for his team.

On September 17, 2010, Douby signed a one–year contract with the Chinese team Xinjiang Flying Tigers.

In March 2012 he signed with UCAM Murcia until the end of the season.

Later that year, he returned to China as a member of the Zhejiang Golden Bulls. On January 2, 2013, Douby set a CBA record for points with 75. During the 2012–13 season, he averaged 31.6 points per game. Douby previously set CBA records for the most points scored in a Finals game (53) and in an All–Star game (44). At the end of the CBA season, he joined Sagesse Beirut in Lebanon. In September 2013, he played for Applied Science University at the 2013 FIBA Asia Champions Cup.

On November 1, 2013, he was acquired by the Sioux Falls Skyforce. Later that month, he left the Skyforce after just two games and signed with the Shanghai Sharks of China.

On February 28, 2014, he signed with Darüşşafaka & Doğuş of the Turkish Basketball Second League for the rest of the season.

In July 2014, he returned to China and signed with Tianjin Ronggang.

On November 18, 2016, Douby was acquired by the Westchester Knicks of the NBA Development League. On December 12, he early terminated his contract with the Knicks after appearing in two games. On January 5, 2017, he signed with Turkish club Afyonkarahisar Belediyespor for the rest of the season.

In August 2017, he signed with Sporting Al Riyadi Beirut of the Lebanese Basketball League.

Career statistics

NBA

Regular season

|-
| style="text-align:left;"| 
| style="text-align:left;"| Sacramento
| 42 || 0 || 8.5 || .381 || .240 || .733 || .9 || .4 || .4 || .1 || 2.8
|-
| style="text-align:left;"| 
| style="text-align:left;"| Sacramento
| 74 || 0 || 11.8 || .394 || .344 || .923 || 1.1 || .7 || .4 || .2 || 4.8
|-
| style="text-align:left;"| 
| style="text-align:left;"| Sacramento
| 20 || 0 || 11.4 || .341 || .270 || .933 || 1.3 || .7 || .1 || .2 || 4.2
|-
| style="text-align:left;"| 
| style="text-align:left;"| Toronto
| 7 || 0 || 10.4 || .545 || .444 || .750 || 1.0 || 1.7 || .4 || .0 || 4.4
|- class="sortbottom"
| style="text-align:center;" colspan="2"| Career
| 143 || 0 || 10.7 || .389 || .312 || .884 || 1.1 || .7 || .3 || .1 || 4.1

Domestic leagues

References

External links

Quincy Douby NBA Draft Profile
Quincy Douby Official MySpace Page
Quincy Douby Music Page
TBL 2009–10 stats

1984 births
Living people
Montenegrin men's basketball players
American men's basketball players
American emigrants to Montenegro
Afyonkarahisar Belediyespor players
American expatriate basketball people in Canada
American expatriate basketball people in China
American expatriate basketball people in Jordan
American expatriate basketball people in Lebanon
American expatriate basketball people in Spain
American expatriate basketball people in Turkey
American sportspeople of Haitian descent
Applied Science University basketball players
Basketball players from New York City
CB Murcia players
Darüşşafaka Basketbol players
Erie BayHawks (2008–2017) players
Liga ACB players
Montenegrin people of African-American descent
Montenegrin people of Haitian descent
Naturalized citizens of Montenegro
Rutgers Scarlet Knights men's basketball players
Sacramento Kings draft picks
Sacramento Kings players
Shanghai Sharks players
Shooting guards
Sioux Falls Skyforce players
Sportspeople from Brooklyn
Tianjin Pioneers players
Toronto Raptors players
Westchester Knicks players
Xinjiang Flying Tigers players
Zhejiang Golden Bulls players
Sagesse SC basketball players
Al Riyadi Club Beirut basketball players